Charles Pickney McCarver (1851 in Jackson County, Tennessee – September 28, 1892) was an American Democratic politician who served as the Mayor of Nashville, Tennessee from 1888 to 1890, resigning before the end of his term.

Personal life
McCarver had three children.

References

1851 births
1892 deaths
Tennessee Democrats
Mayors of Nashville, Tennessee
People from Jackson County, Tennessee
19th-century American politicians